is a Japanese wrestler. He competed in the men's Greco-Roman welterweight at the 1960 Summer Olympics.

References

1937 births
Living people
Japanese male sport wrestlers
Olympic wrestlers of Japan
Wrestlers at the 1960 Summer Olympics
Sportspeople from Hokkaido
20th-century Japanese people